The 2018–19 season was Hibernian's (Hibs) second season of play back in the top league of Scottish football (the Scottish Premiership), having been promoted from the Scottish Championship at the end of the 2016–17 season. Hibs also entered the Europa League, and progressed through two qualifying rounds before losing to Norwegian club Molde. They were knocked out of the League Cup in a penalty shootout by Aberdeen, and in the Scottish Cup by Celtic, and finished fifth in the league.

Hibs manager Neil Lennon was suspended by the club on 26 January 2019, and was subsequently replaced by Paul Heckingbottom.

Results and fixtures

Friendlies

Scottish Premiership

The schedule for the first 33 rounds of the 2018–19 Premiership was announced on 15 June 2018.

League Cup

As one of the four clubs participating in European competition, Hibs received a bye to the second round (last 16) of the League Cup. Hibs defeated Ross County in the second round, and were paired with Aberdeen in the quarter-finals. After both the regulation time and extra time periods finished goalless, Aberdeen won a penalty shootout to progress to the semi-finals.

Scottish Cup

As a Premiership club, Hibernian entered the Scottish Cup at the fourth round stage and were drawn at home to League Two club Elgin City. They won 4–0 and were then drawn at home to Raith Rovers in the fifth round. A 3–1 victory put Hibs into the quarter-final, where they were drawn at home to cup holders Celtic. They lost 2–0 to a Celtic side managed by Neil Lennon, who had left Hibs four weeks previously.

UEFA Europa League
Having finished fourth in the 2017–18 Scottish Premiership, Hibs qualified for the 2018–19 UEFA Europa League. In the first qualifying round they were paired with Faroese club Runavík.

Player statistics

|-
! colspan=13 style=background:#dcdcdc; text-align:center| Goalkeepers
|-

|-
! colspan=13 style=background:#dcdcdc; text-align:center| Defenders
|-

|-
! colspan=13 style=background:#dcdcdc; text-align:center| Midfielders
|-

|-
! colspan=13 style=background:#dcdcdc; text-align:center| Forwards
|-

Club statistics

League table

Division summary

Management statistics

Transfers

Players in

Players out

Loans in

Loans out

See also
List of Hibernian F.C. seasons

Notes

References

2018-19
Scottish football clubs 2018–19 season
2018–19 UEFA Europa League participants seasons